The Price Is Right is a television game show franchise created by Bob Stewart, originally produced by Mark Goodson and Bill Todman; currently it is produced and owned by Fremantle. The franchise centers on television game shows, but also includes merchandise such as video games, printed media, and board games. The franchise began in 1956 as a television game show hosted by Bill Cullen and was revamped in 1972. This version was originally hosted by Bob Barker. Drew Carey has hosted the program since 2007.

Contestants on the show compete to win cash and prizes by guessing the price of merchandise. The program has been critically successful and remains a stalwart in the television ratings. It also managed to break away from the quiz show format that has been used in other game shows. Since the current version premiered, it has also been adapted in several international formats around the world most notably in the United Kingdom, Spain, Australia, Mexico, and Vietnam.

In 2013, TV Guide ranked it No. 5 in its list of the 60 greatest game shows ever.

1956–1965

The original version of The Price Is Right was first broadcast on NBC, and later ABC, from 1956 to 1965. Hosted by Bill Cullen, it involved four contestants bidding on a wide array of merchandise prizes with retail prices ranging from a few dollars (in many cases, "bonus" prizes were given to the winner afterward) to thousands. Though conducted in an auction style, Cullen did not play the role of auctioneer. Instead, contestants would try to bid as close to a product's actual retail price without exceeding that price. Depending on the prize, contestants were either allowed, in proper turn, to make multiple bids, or restricted to only one bid. In the case of the former, each contestant would bid on an item until a buzzer sounded. The contestant could make a final bid, or "freeze." The contestant whose bid was closest to, but not more than, the correct value of the prize won it. There was also a special game set aside for the home viewer that offered several prizes in a package, which usually included a luxury vacation trip and/or a new car. Viewers submitted their bids via postcards, and the winner was announced on the air. At the end of each episode, the contestant who had won the most (by dollar value) was declared the winner and became the returning champion, entitled to play again on the next episode.

This version began as part of NBC's daytime schedule. A series of technical problems allegedly made the pilot episode look bad enough for NBC to decline to purchase the show, but after an appeal from the producers, citing the fact that all TV shows at the time were given at least 13 weeks to succeed or fail, it aired on the network. It became successful enough to warrant a second version of the series, beginning on prime time in the fall of 1957. Shown weekly, that version became the first TV game show to be broadcast in color. After being a top-10 primetime show for some time, the show's ratings gradually but noticeably declined, and by 1963 NBC had canceled it. The show was then picked up by ABC and ran in prime time on that network for one full season (1963–64); the daytime version ended in 1965.

1972–present

Format
Since 1972, the current version of The Price Is Right has used the same structure:
 One Bid, in which four players in Contestants' Row bid on a prize, attempting to give the prize's suggested retail price without exceeding it. The price is revealed and the player with the winning bid goes on stage to play a pricing game. The first four players on Contestants' Row are called from the studio audience at the start of the show, and after each pricing game, a new player is called to fill the vacant slot. 
 Pricing games, in which the contestant plays for a range of prizes, frequently money or automobiles, with most games based on the player's knowledge of the retail price of the prizes or other consumer goods like food and household products.
 The Showcase, in which the two top players of the day are shown two showcases, which are collections of prizes. After the first showcase is revealed, the top player is awarded the option of bidding on the first showcase or passing it to the other player. The second showcase is then revealed and bid upon by the player who did not bid upon the first. The player who bids closer to, but does not exceed, the total retail price of their showcase wins it. If the difference between a contestant's bid and the showcase's value is within a certain range, the player wins both showcases; this range has varied over time. If both players overbid, neither wins.

When the new format debuted as The New Price Is Right, shows were 30 minutes in length; three pricing games were played and the two contestants with the highest winnings entered the Showcase. By June 1973, the show was renamed back to The Price Is Right.

The show was expanded into an hour-long format on November 3, 1975, allowing six pricing games to be played per episode. A new feature, the Showcase Showdown, was added to select the two players for the Showcase. It is played after the first three players have completed their pricing games to select one player from the first half of the show, and again after the last three. In the Showdown, each player is given two chances to spin a large wheel that displays all amounts from 5¢ to $1.00 in 5¢ increments. The player may elect to hold after his or her first spin or to take a second spin; if a second spin occurs, the amount of the second spin is added to the first spin, potentially causing the contestant's total to exceed $1.00 and eliminate the contestant. The player whose total is the closest to $1.00 without exceeding $1.00 advances to the Showcase. A score of exactly $1.00, accomplished by either the first spin stopping on the $1.00 value or by the total of two spins equaling $1.00, awards a cash bonus and gives the player a chance to win larger amounts in a bonus spin.

History
The series debuted on September 4, 1972, in two forms: a daily version on CBS with Bob Barker as host, and a weekly version, eventually dubbed "the nighttime Price Is Right," hosted by Dennis James and airing in first-run syndication. Barker took over the nighttime version in 1977 (which remained a half-hour in length throughout its existence) and hosted both until the nighttime version was discontinued in 1980. The syndicated nighttime version returned five years later, airing five times per week, but ran for only one season, with Tom Kennedy as host.

Barker hosted the program from its debut until June 15, 2007. During the 35 years he was the host, Barker won numerous awards and honors, including Daytime Emmys and a Lifetime Achievement Award. Directors of the show included Marc Breslow, Paul Alter, and Bart Eskander, who received a Daytime Emmy for Outstanding Direction of a Game Show. Producer Roger Dobkowitz won a Daytime Emmy for his work on the show, which included the development of many of the show's games that are still played today.

After a search for Barker's successor, Drew Carey was named the new host, and production resumed in August 2007, with Carey's first episode airing on October 15.

The Price Is Right is believed to be the longest-running game show on television (the Spanish-language variety show Sábado Gigante ended on September 19, 2015). It is also the longest-running five-days-per-week game show in the world. The Price Is Right is one of two game show franchises (along with To Tell the Truth) to be seen nationally in either first-run network or syndication airings in the U.S. in every decade since the 1950s. CBS has occasionally aired extra episodes of the show for short periods between the cancellation of one daytime program and the premiere of its successor. On occasion since 1986, special episodes have aired during primetime hours, most notably to fill in gaps between the Survivor series and during the 2007–08 Writers Guild of America strike.

On September 22, 2008, Terry Kneiss made game-show history by bidding the exact amount of his $23,743 showcase. Taping of the show immediately stopped, with Carey and show staffers concerned that cheating was taking place. It was later learned that Ted Slauson, an audience member and long-time fan of the show, had legitimately determined the exact prices of the showcase items after having frequently watched the show, noticing the frequency of certain products and using statistical analysis. Slauson shared this knowledge with Kneiss's wife Linda, who was sitting beside him in the audience, and she signaled the total to her husband on the stage. Kneiss was awarded the prizes, and the show subsequently discontinued certain prizes.

On April Fools' Day in 2014, Craig Ferguson and Carey switched hosting duties, with Carey hosting The Late Late Show and Ferguson hosting The Price Is Right. The episode also featured Shadoe Stevens as announcer. Barker appeared on the April Fools' Day episode in 2015, hosting while the first item up was for bids and the first pricing game; Carey hosted the remainder of the episode.

Broadcast history

Since December 1, 2020, Pluto TV airs 1980s-era episodes from the Bob Barker period on its streaming channel "The Price Is Right: The Barker Era".

Specials
Primetime episodes have been ordered by CBS on occasion since 1986. The first, The Price Is Right Special, was a six-week summer series that aired on CBS in 1986, hosted by Barker. In 2002, the show celebrated its 30th year with a Las Vegas special.

Later in 2002, the show began its current line of primetime episodes (known as #xxxSP in show codes). Six special episodes titled The Price Is Right Salutes aired in primetime, saluting the branches of the United States armed forces, police, and firefighters of in the wake of the September 11 attacks. The Price Is Right $1,000,000 Spectacular (#007SP-#033SP) was a series of primetime specials airing from 2003 until 2008 featuring chances to win $1,000,000, as well as more expensive prizes than on the daytime counterpart.

The Celebrity Week format in daytime in which a celebrity plays along with contestants was adopted for the next series of primetime episodes, part of the same series as the 2002 Salutes and 2003–08 $1,000,000 Spectaculars (since #034SP). These shows used former participants on the network's three primetime reality game shows (Survivor, The Amazing Race, and Big Brother) who joined contestants as teams. The three-night special aired May 23–25, 2016. Another series of specials, #037SP (with cast members from SEAL Team, mainly David Boreanaz, Max Thieriot, Neil Brown Jr., A.J. Buckley, Toni Trucks, Justin Melnick, and Dita the Dog) and #038SP (featuring Seth Rogen), aired during the 2019–20 television season, and three more episodes have been ordered by CBS to air during the season, #039SP-#041SP. Episodes starting with #037SP are designated as The Price Is Right at Night, with color changes to the show's logo (blue and green instead of red and orange) to represent an evening motif instead of the bright colors of the daytime show.

The civilian-celebrity format beginning with 037SP offers a charitable donation to the celebrity's charity equivalent to the total cash and prizes won, similar to the format used in daytime.

On January 12, 2020, CBS announced that three more specials would air in spring 2020.

Licensed merchandise
Endless Games, which has produced board games based on several other game shows, including The Newlywed Game and Million Dollar Password, distributes home versions of The Price Is Right, featuring the voice of announcer Rich Fields, including a DVD edition and a Quick Picks travel-size edition. Ubisoft also released a video game version of the show for the PC, Nintendo DS and Wii console on September 9, 2008. An updated version of the game (The Price Is Right: 2010 Edition) was released on September 22, 2009. Both versions feature the voice of Fields.

In September 2010, Ludia released the official Facebook version of The Price Is Right game. The game had two million monthly active users only two months after the launch.

In October 2011, Ludia (now owned by RTL Group) released The Price Is Right Decades, a video game featuring production elements from various decades of the show, for the Wii, mobile devices, PlayStation 3 and Xbox 360 to celebrate the show's 40th anniversary.

International versions
The 1972 revised format appeared on Australian television the following year and debuted in the U.K. in 1984. The format has also been adapted elsewhere around the world. Hosts and models from the versions in other countries have made appearances on the U.S. version, usually sitting in the audience and acknowledged by the host during the broadcast. Barker and music director Stan Blits appeared on the Carlo Boszhard-hosted Cash en Carlo at the start of the 200th episode.

 Airing  Not airing  Upcoming or returning version

See also
List of television show franchises

References

External links

Official Fremantle website and video social network community for The Price Is Right
Official CBS website for The Price Is Right
The Price Is Right at the National Film and Sound Archive
 

 
Television series by Mark Goodson-Bill Todman Productions
Television series by Fremantle (company)
Television franchises